Moloney is an American crime drama television program created by Ronald Bass and Jane Rusconi, originally broadcast on CBS from September 19, 1996 to May 22, 1997. The program was cancelled in May 1997 after one season.

Premise
Nicholas "Nick" Moloney (Peter Strauss) is a Los Angeles cop and a licensed psychiatrist.  Unlike the department's other staff psychiatrists, Moloney is also a fully commissioned police officer who can make arrests.  This provides advantages, but also a considerable conflict of interest. Often, Moloney finds himself unable to use his inside knowledge to enforce the law because to do so would be an unethical breach of doctor–patient privilege.

Cast
 Peter Strauss as Nick Moloney
 Nestor Serrano as Lt. Matty Navarro
 Wendell Pierce as D.A. Cal Patterson
 Cherie Lunghi as Dr. Sarah Bateman
 Giuliana Santini as Det. Angela Vecchio 
 Ashley Johnson as Katherine 'Kate' Moloney

Episodes

References
 Brooks, Tim and Marsh, Earle, The Complete Directory to Prime Time Network TV Shows

External links

CBS original programming
1990s American crime television series
1996 American television series debuts
1997 American television series endings
Television shows set in Los Angeles
English-language television shows
Television series by Sony Pictures Television
Television series by CBS Studios